Sky News Election Channel was an Australian 24-hour cable and satellite news channel available on the Foxtel platform, operated by Sky News Australia. It launched on 1 May 2016, temporarily replacing A-PAC as a linear channel, dedicated to coverage of political events relating to the 2016 Australian federal election and American presidential election. Although the channel was originally planned to close on 29 November 2016 (with A-PAC returning as a broadcast channel), this was later postponed, and ultimately the channel did not cease broadcasting until 23 January 2017.

Programming
The channel broadcast coverage of news conferences, policy announcements and events related to the Australian and American elections, as well as the United Kingdom referendum on remaining in the European Union. It also broadcasts coverage and programming from Sky News' international partners including Sky News UK, C-SPAN, CBS News and ABC World News.

Reruns of Sky News original programs including AM Agenda, PM Agenda, Paul Murray Live, Beattie & Reith and The Bolt Report were also part of the schedule.

It debuted in time to broadcast President Barack Obama's final address at the White House Correspondents’ Association live as the channel's first major event.

The channel also broadcast coverage of the memorial service for Muhammad Ali on 11 June 2016.

The 2016 Walkley Awards were broadcast on both the Election Channel and A-PAC on 2 December 2016.

Availability
The channel was available on the Foxtel platform on two channels, 606 and 648, temporarily replacing Sky News Extra on the latter which became available only online and through the Sky News Multiview service. Although the channel was only initially available in standard definition, a high definition simulcast of the channel launched on 15 May 2016.

References

24-hour television news channels in Australia
Legislature broadcasters
Television channels and stations established in 2016
Television channels and stations disestablished in 2017
English-language television stations in Australia
Defunct television channels in Australia
Sky News Australia